Código fuego is a Spanish thriller drama television series created by Víctor Mato and Juanjo Díaz Polo that originally aired on Antena 3 in 2003. Produced by Cartel, its cast, led by José Coronado and Maribel Verdú, also featured the likes of Pedro Alonso, Pepo Oliva, Marián Aguilera, Antonio de la Torre, Cuca Escribano and Ramón Langa, among others. After a good performance of the pilot episode, the series' viewership ratings abruptly decreased to the point the series was cancelled with 2 episodes left unaired in the original run.

Premise 
The plot tracks the personal and professional developments of a group of firefighters working at the 'Parque de Bomberos número 16'.

Cast

Production and release 
Código fuego was created by Víctor Mato and Juanjo Díaz Polo and was produced by Cartel for Antena 3. Directed by Eva Lesmes and Miguel Ángel Díez, the series began filming in December 2002. It premiered on 15 January 2003, earning a 24.8% audience share. It was axed out by Antena 3 after the 6th episode, broadcast on 26 February (which earned a 14.1% share), reportedly because it "had not  met the network's audience expectations", leaving 2 unaired episodes. The series proved to be one of the biggest blunders of the television season.

References 

Antena 3 (Spanish TV channel) network series
2000s workplace drama television series
2003 Spanish television series debuts
Spanish thriller television series
2000s Spanish drama television series
Spanish-language television shows
Television series about firefighting